Nicolas Hakim is an American musician based in Brooklyn, New York, United States. His first EP, Where Will We Go Part 1 & 2, was self-released in 2014. His debut album, Green Twins was released in May 2017, followed by his second studio-album, Will This Make Me Good, released in May 2020.

Career 
Nick Hakim was born and raised in Washington, D.C. by his parents, a Chilean mother and Peruvian father, where he was surrounded by a diverse array of musical influences. At 17, a friend invited him to sing with her church choir, where Hakim taught himself to play piano. Soon after, he was accepted to attend Boston’s Berklee College of Music, and whilst there, he released 2014’s two-part EPs, Where Will We Go.

In 2017, Hakim released Green Twins through ATO Records and toured internationally. The album went on to earn critical acclaim by media outlets including Pitchfork and The Guardian, and was named one of the Ten Best R&B Albums of 2017 by NPR. Vice called it a "soulful, psychedelic experience". One of the tracks off the album, "Needy Bees" was featured in an episode of HBO's Insecure. The following year, Hakim contributed original music to HBO's Random Acts of Flyness, directed by long time collaborator, Terence Nance. In 2018, Hakim performed on NPR's Tiny Desk Concerts.

In 2020 he released his second studio album Will This Make Me Good. He collaborated with Erykah Badu and contributed to her live stream concert series ‘Too Sensitive’ in September 2020. A remixed version of Will This Make Me Good was released in 2021 and included remixes from BadBadNotGood, KeiyaA, Slauson Malone, Pink Siifu and more.

Discography 
 Where Will We Go (Part I) (July, 2014)
 Where Will We Go (Part II) (September, 2014)
 Green Twins (2017)
 Will This Make Me Good (2020)
 Small Things (2021)
 COMETA         (2022)

 SCURRRRED'' (2022) Pink Siifu Asal Hazel

References

Further reading 
 

Living people
Year of birth missing (living people)
American rhythm and blues musicians
ATO Records artists